Stella Elmendorf Tylor (17 December 1885 – 1980) was an American artist.

Biography
She was born in San Antonio, Texas on 17 December 1885 as Stella Elmendorf. As an artist she studied with Robert Henri of the Art Students League in Manhattan from 1910 to 1911. She participated in the Armory Show of 1910. In September 1919 she married W. Russell Tylor, a physician, in Madison, Wisconsin. They had one child, a daughter, who was born on May 2, 1925 in Chicago, Illinois.

Tylor died in 1980.

References

1885 births
1980 deaths
20th-century American women artists
Artists from Texas
People from San Antonio